Ashlyn Watkins is an American college basketball player for the South Carolina Gamecocks of the Southeastern Conference (SEC).

High school career 
While playing high school basketball for Cardinal Newman High School in Columbia, South Carolina, Watkins was named a McDonald’s All-American and the South Carolina Gatorade Player of the Year in 2022.  Watkins won the McDonald’s All-American Dunk Contest.

Watkins started dunking in middle school while attending Cardinal Newman.

College career 
In March 2022, Watkins won the Powerade JamFest dunk contest.

On November 17, 2022, Watkins stole the ball in the closing seconds of No. 1 South Carolina’s 85-31 road win against Clemson. Once in possession of the ball, Watkins dribbled the ball to the basket and slammed it, the first dunk in South Carolina women’s basketball history.

References

External links 
 South Carolina Gamecocks bio

Living people
American women's basketball players
Year of birth missing (living people)
South Carolina Gamecocks women's basketball players